The 1983 Grand Prix d'Automne was the 77th edition of the Paris–Tours cycle race and was held on 9 October 1983. The race started in Blois and finished in Chaville. The race was won by Ludo Peeters.

General classification

References

1983 in French sport
1983
October 1983 sports events in Europe
1983 Super Prestige Pernod